Sidi Kacem is a province in the Moroccan economic region of Rabat-Salé-Kénitra. The capital is Sidi Kacem. Its population in 2004 was 692,239  and it recorded a population of 522,270 in the 2014 Moroccan census.

The major cities and towns are: 
 Ain Dorij
 Dar Gueddari
 Had Kourt
 Jorf El Melha
 Khenichet
 Mechra Bel Ksiri
 Sidi Kacem
 Zirara

Subdivisions
The province is divided administratively into the following municipalities and communes:

References

 
Sidi Kacem